In the field of data management, data classification as a part of the Information Lifecycle Management (ILM) process can be defined as a tool for categorization of data to enable/help organizations to effectively answer the following questions:
What data types are available?
Where are certain data located?
What access levels are implemented?
What protection level is implemented and does it adhere to compliance regulations?

When implemented it provides a bridge between IT professionals and process or application owners. IT staff are informed about the data value and management (usually application owners) understands better which part of the data centre needs to be invested in to keep operations running effectively. This can be of particular importance in risk management, legal discovery, and compliance with government regulations. Data classification is typically a manual process; however, there are many tools from different vendors that can help gather information about the data.

Data classification needs to take into account the following:

 Regulatory requirements
 Strategic or proprietary worth
 Organization specific policies
 Ethical and privacy considerations
 Contractual agreements

How to start process of data classification?

Note that this classification structure is written from a Data Management perspective and therefore has a focus for text and text convertible binary data sources. Images, videos, and audio files are highly structured formats built for industry standard API's and do not readily fit within the classification scheme outlined below.

Evaluation and a division of the various data applications and data into their respective categories is needed to start the data classification process. For example, the process may look like:
Relational or Tabular data (around 15% of non audio/video data) 
Generally describes proprietary data which can be accessible only through application or application programming interfaces (API).
Applications that produce structured data are usually database applications.
This type of data usually brings complex procedures of data evaluation and migration between the storage tiers.
To ensure adequate quality standards, the classification process has to be monitored by subject matter experts.
Semi-structured or Poly-structured data (all other non-audio/video data that does not conform to a system or platform defined Relational or Tabular form).
Generally describes data files that have a dynamic or non-relational semantic structure (e.g. documents, XML, JSON, Device or System Log output, Sensor Output, etc.).
Relatively simple process of data classification is criteria assignment.
Simple process of data migration between assigned segments of predefined storage tiers.

There are different types of data classification  used. Please note that this designation is entirely orthogonal to the application-centric designation outlined above. Regardless of structure inherited from application, data may be of a certain type, such as: 

1. Geographical

2. Chronological

3. Qualitative

4. Quantitative

It should also be evaluated across three dimensions:

 Identifiability: how easily can this data be used to identify an individual?
 Sensitivity: how much damage could be done if this data reached the wrong hands?
 Scarcity: how readily available is this data?

Basic criteria for semi-structured or poly-structured data classification
Time criteria are the simplest and most commonly used, where different types of data are evaluated by time of creation, time of access, time of update, etc.
Metadata criteria as type, name, owner, location, and so on can be used to create more advanced classification policy.
Content criteria which involve usage of advanced content classification algorithms are most advanced forms of unstructured data classification.

Note that any of these criteria may also apply to Tabular or Relational data as "Basic Criteria." These criteria are application specific, rather than inherent aspects of the form in which the data is presented..

Basic criteria for relational or Tabular data classification
These criteria are usually initiated by application requirements such as:
Disaster recovery and Business Continuity rules
Data centre resources optimization and consolidation
Hardware performance limitations and possible improvements by reorganization

Note that any of these criteria may also apply to semi/poly structured data as "Basic Criteria." These criteria are application specific, rather than inherent aspects of the form in which the data is presented.

Benefits of data classification
Benefits of effective implementation of appropriate data classification can significantly improve ILM process and save data centre storage resources. If implemented systemically it can generate improvements in data centre performance and utilization. Data classification can also reduce costs and administration overhead. "Good enough" data classification can produce these results:
Data compliance and easier risk management. Data are located where expected on predefined storage tier and "point in time"
Simplification of data encryption because all data need not be encrypted. This saves valuable processor cycles and all related consecutiveness. 
Data indexing to improve user access times
Data protection is redefined where RTO (Recovery Time Objective) is improved.

Business data classification approaches 
There are three different approaches to data classification within a business environment, each of these techniques – paper-based classification, automated classification and user-driven (or user-applied) classification – has its own benefits and pitfalls.

Paper-Based Classification Policy 
A corporate data classification policy will set out how employees are required to treat the different types of data they handle, aligned with the organisation's overall data security policy and strategy. A well-written policy will enable users to make fast and intuitive decisions about the value of a piece of information, and what the appropriate handling rules are for example who can access the data and should a rights management template be invoked. The challenge, without any supporting technology, is ensuring that everyone is aware of the policy and implements it correctly.

Automated Classification Policy 
This technique bypasses the users’ involvement, enforcing a classification policy to be consistently applied across all touchpoints, without the need for major communication and education programmes.

Classifications are applied by solutions that use software algorithms based on keywords or phrases in the content to analyse and classify it. This approach comes into its own where certain types of data are created with no user involvement – for example reports generated by ERP systems or where the data includes specific personal information which is easily identified such as credit card details.

However, automated solutions do not understand context and are therefore susceptible to inaccuracies, giving false positive results that can frustrate users and impede business processes, as well as false negative errors that expose organisations to sensitive data loss.

User-Driven Classification Policy 
The data classification process can be completely automated, but it is most effective when the user is placed in the driving seat.

The user-driven classification technique makes employees themselves responsible for deciding which label is appropriate, and attaching it using a software tool at the point of creating, editing, sending or saving. The advantage of involving the user in the process is that their insight into the context, business value and sensitivity of a piece of data enables them to make informed and accurate decisions about which label to apply. User-driven classification is an additional security layer often used to complement automated classification.

Involving users in classification also leads to other organisational benefits including increased security awareness, an improved culture and the ability to monitor user behaviour which aids reporting and provides the ability to demonstrate compliance. Furthermore, managers can use this behavioural data to identify a possible insider threat, and address any concerns by providing additional guidance to users as appropriate, for example through additional training or by tightening up policy.

See also
Data classification (business intelligence)

References

 Josh Judd and Dan Kruger (2005), Principles of SAN Design. Infinity Publishing
 Stephen J. Bigelown (November 2005), SearchStorage.com, http://searchstorage.techtarget.com/news/article/0,289142,sid5_gci1139240,00.html

Data management